Dennis Head Old Beacon is a ruined lighthouse on the island of North Ronaldsay, Orkney, Scotland. The beacon and keepers' houses are protected as a scheduled monument.

The  tower was completed in 1789 under the supervision of Thomas Smith assisted by his stepson Robert Stevenson.  It was to be the first of many island lighthouses for Smith (he had previously worked on the lights at Kinnaird Head and Mull of Kintyre). Its lighting system, although advanced for its time, consisting of a cluster of oil-burning lamps and reflectors was not very effective, often being mistaken for the mast-head of another ship by mariners.

In 1809, with the construction of other nearby lighthouses, it was decided that the North Ronaldsay light was no longer required, and it was extinguished. The round stone tower was retained as a sea-mark, however, and the original beacon chamber at the top replaced by a vaulted roof, capped by a remarkable ball finial. The stone spiral staircase which once led to the beacon was demolished. The original keepers' houses, roofless but largely complete, survive below the tower.

The Old Beacon featured on the 2006 BBC television series Restoration Village finishing in third place.

North Ronaldsay Lighthouse was built nearby in 1854.

References

External links

Lighthouses completed in 1789
Towers completed in 1789
Ruins in Orkney
Lighthouses in Orkney
1789 establishments in Scotland
Scheduled Ancient Monuments in Orkney
North Ronaldsay